The 2017 CrownBet Darwin Triple Crown was a motor racing event for the Supercars Championship, held on the weekend of 16 to 18 June 2017. The event was held at Hidden Valley Raceway near Darwin in the Northern Territory and consisted of two races, 120 and 200 kilometres in length. It is the sixth event of fourteen in the 2017 Supercars Championship and hosted Races 11 and 12 of the season.

Background

Driver changes
Taz Douglas was replaced at Lucas Dumbrell Motorsport with Cameron McConville.

This was the third round in which Super2 Series wildcards were allowed to compete in the main class. Jack Le Brocq and Macauley Jones were the two drivers to step up for this round.

References

Darwin Triple Crown
Darwin Triple Crown
Sport in Darwin, Northern Territory
2010s in the Northern Territory
Motorsport in the Northern Territory